In geology, lake capture is the process of capture (see Stream capture) of the waters collected in a lake by a neighbor river basin.

The occurrence of a lake capture is mainly controlled by the water balance at the lake's basin and the changes in topography due to erosion, sedimentation, and tectonism. If evaporation at the surface of a lake, plus the water losses through underground infiltration and plant evapotranspiration are high enough to account for all precipitation water collected by the lake, then the lake becomes endorheic, closed, or internally drained. This situation prevails until the water balance changes again and the lake overburdens the limits of its basin or until the lake capture occurs. Opening the drainage of an endorheic lacustrine basin by fluvial erosion generally implies a lake capture.

Lake captures are therefore very sensitive to the preexisting topography as well as to climatic and lithological factors. A climatic change towards more humid conditions can result in a higher water level in the internally drained basin, eventually causing overflow, this . In a longer time-scale, sediment colmatation of the lacustrine basin can also lead to overflow. Both can hinder the relative importance of the capture process carried out by erosion.

Examples include the Late Neogen capture of the endorheic Ebro Basin (capture) or the Pleistocene Lake Bonneville.

See also
River capture
Regressive erosion

References

Endorheic lakes
Geomorphology